Christian Carstensen (born 11 March 1973 in Hamburg) is a German politician and member of the Social Democratic Party (SPD). He was a member of the Hamburg-Nord district parliament (Bezirksversammlung) from 2001 to 2005. In 2005 he was elected to the Bundestag, the German federal parliament, representing Hamburg-Nord, however he lost his seat at the 2009 election.

References 
 

1973 births
Living people
Members of the Bundestag for Hamburg
Members of the Bundestag 2005–2009
Members of the Bundestag for the Social Democratic Party of Germany